Baloncesto Málaga, S.A.D., for sponsorship reasons named Unicaja, is a Spanish professional basketball team that is based in Málaga, Spain. The team plays in the Liga ACB and the Basketball Champions League. The team is sponsored by the Spanish bank Unicaja.

History
Unicaja was originally founded in 1977, as CB Caja de Ronda. In 1992, the club merged another ACB team in the city of Málaga, CB Maristas de Málaga, which was originally founded in 1953 as Ademar Basket Club. Over the years, the club has featured players like: Nacho Rodríguez, Berni Rodríguez, Carlos Cabezas, Jorge Garbajosa, Marcus Brown, Sergei Babkov, Michael Ansley, Louis Bullock, and Kenny Miller, as well as numerous other well-known players. The club won its first title, when it won the European-wide third tier level FIBA Korać Cup in the 2000–01 season. They then won the Spanish King's Cup title in 2005. The next year, in the 2005–06 season, Unicaja won its first-ever Spanish League championship.

The club finished its best years to date, by qualifying for the 2007 Euroleague Final Four, where it was defeated in the semifinals by CSKA Moscow, and thus finished in third place in the EuroLeague. In October 2007, Unicaja faced the NBA's Memphis Grizzlies in a friendly match, and they defeated the Grizzlies, by a score of 102–99. That was one of the 17 times that an NBA team has lost to a foreign club.  Pau Gasol and Juan Carlos Navarro, two of the greatest Spanish basketball players of all time, played for Memphis in that historical game.

Málaga participated in the European-wide top-tier level league, the EuroLeague, for 15 consecutive seasons (2001–02 season to 2015–16 season). However, in the summer of 2015, it lost its EuroLeague A-licence. Therefore, in the 2016–17 season, Unicaja participated in the second tier level EuroCup. The club immediately won the EuroCup title, in its first season in the league, after winning over Valencia Basket in the league's Finals.

Logos

Home arenas

Pabellón Guadaljaire (1977–78)
Pabellón Tiro Pichón (1978–81)
Pabellón Ciudad Jardín (1981–99)
Palacio de Deportes José María Martín Carpena (1999–present)

Since 1999, Unicaja Málaga has played its home games at the Palacio de Deportes José María Martín Carpena arena. The arena originally seated 9,743 spectators for basketball games, and was expanded in the year 2010, to a current seating capacity of 11,300 people for basketball games.

Players

Retired numbers

Current roster

Depth chart

Notable players

  Álex Abrines
  Curro Ávalos
  Saúl Blanco
  Carlos Cabezas
  Iñaki De Miguel
  Alberto Díaz
  Dani Díez
  Roger Esteller
  Jaime Fernández
  Xavi Fernández
  Germán Gabriel
  Jorge Garbajosa
  Ricardo Guillén
  Carlos Jiménez
  Tomás Jofresa
  Chuck Kornegay
  Pablo Laso
  Jesús Lázaro
  Juan Antonio Orenga
  Alfonso Reyes
  Berni Rodríguez
  Mario Muñoz Oses
  Ignacio Rodríguez
  Dani Romero
  Gaby Ruiz
  Mike Smith
  Carlos Suárez
  Fran Vázquez
  Paco Vázquez
  Sergi Vidal
  Jean-Jacques Conceição
  Juan Ignacio Sánchez
  Walter Herrmann
 Steve Leven
  Ademola Okulaja
  Marcus Faison
  Jean-Marc Jaumin
  JR Bremer
  Nedžad Sinanović
  Vítor Faverani
  Rafael Hettsheimeir
  Augusto Lima
  Rafa Luz
  Paulo Prestes
  Roderick Blakney
  Earl Calloway
  Earl Rowland
  Kyle Wiltjer
  Ivan Grgat
  Davor Kus
  Oliver Lafayette
  Veljko Mršić
  Sandro Nicević
  Hrvoje Perić
  Krunoslav Simon
  Zan Tabak
  Luka Žorić
  Jiri Welsch
  Christian Eyenga
  Juan José García
  Sasu Salin
  Joseph Gomis
  Edwin Jackson
  Mathias Lessort
  Florent Pietrus
  Stéphane Risacher
  Moustapha Sonko
  Frédéric Weis
  Giorgi Shermadini
  Shammond Williams
  Robert Archibald
  Joel Freeland
  Darren Phillip
  Morayo Soluade
  Ioannis Giannoulis
  Georgios Printezis
  Kostas Vasileiadis
  Robert Gulyás
  Pavel Ermolinskij
  Jon Stefansson
 Gal Mekel
  Jeff Brooks
  Kaspars Berzins
  Kristaps Valters
  Gintaras Einikis
  Mindaugas Kuzminskas
  Domantas Sabonis
  Richard Hendrix
  Omar Cook
  Vladimir Golubović
  Michał Chyliński
  Thomas Kelati 
  Adam Waczyński
  Adam Wójcik
  José Ortiz
  Daniel Santiago
  Hamady Ndiaye
  Boniface Ndong
  Milan Gurović
  Stefan Marković
  Dragan Milosavljević
  Dejan Musli
  Nemanja Nedović
  Kosta Perović
  Bojan Popović
  Vladimir Štimac
  Uroš Tripković
  Zoran Dragić
  Erazem Lorbek
  Alen Omić
  Marko Tusek
  Richard Petruska
  Sergei Babkov
  Valeri Tikhonenko
  Volodymyr Gerun
  Pooh Jeter
  Panchi Barrera
  Jayson Granger
  Fredy Navarrete
  Joe Arlauckas
  Victor Alexander
  James Augustine
  Mario Bennett
  Adrian Branch
  Marcus Brown
  Louis Bullock
  Jack Cooley
  Juan Dixon
  Zabian Dowdell
  Jamie Feick
  Gerald Fitch
  Kyle Fogg
  Marcus Haislip
  Marc Iavaroni
  Tarence Kinsey
  Tony Massenburg
  Ray McCallum Jr.
  Kenny Miller
  Gary Neal
  DeMarcus Nelson
  Andy Panko
  Brian Roberts
  Lou Roe
  Sean Rooks
  Ralph Sampson
  Paul Shirley
  Reggie Slater
  Ray Tolbert
  Marcus Williams
  David Wood

Head coaches

Alfonso Queipo de Llano: 1977–79, 1985–86
José María Martín Urbano : 1979–80, 1982, 1985, 1987, 1990–92
Damián Caneda: 1980–81
Ramón Guardiola: 1981–82
Moncho Monsalve: 1982–84
Ignacio Pinedo: 1984–85
Arturo Ortega: 1986–87
Zoran Slavnić: 1987–88
Mario Pesquera: 1988–90
Javier Imbroda: 1992–98
Pedro Ramírez: 1998–99
Božidar Maljković: 1999–03
Paco Alonso: 2003
Chechu Mulero: 2003
Sergio Scariolo: 2003–08
Aito Garcia Reneses: 2008–2011
Chus Mateo: 2011–12
Luis Casimiro: 2012
Jasmin Repeša: 2012–13
Joan Plaza: 2013–2018
Luis Casimiro: 2018–2021
Fotios Katsikaris: 2021–2022
Ibon Navarro: 2022–present

Season by season

CB Caja de Ronda

CB Maristas

Unicaja

Honours and awards

Honours
National:
Liga ACB (Spanish League): (1)
 2005–06
Copa del Rey (Spanish Cup): (2)
 2005, 2023
2nd division championships: (2)
1ª División B: 1981, 1987
Andalusia Cup: (15)
 1996, 2001, 2003, 2007, 2008, 2010, 2011, 2012, 2014, 2015, 2016, 2017, 2018, 2020, 2021
International:
EuroCup: (1)
 2017
Korać Cup: (1)
 2001
EuroLeague:
 Third Place: 2007
Other competitions: 
Torrox, Spain Invitational Game
 2008
Trofeo de Platja d'Aro
 2008
Trofeo Pollinica
 2008
Trofeo Ciudad de Cordoba, Spain
 2009

Individual awards

ACB Finals MVP
Michael Ansley – 1995
Jorge Garbajosa – 2006

Spanish Cup MVP
Jorge Garbajosa – 2005

ACB Slam Dunk Champion
Florent Piétrus – 2006
James Gist – 2012

ACB Three Point Shootout Champion
Paco Vázquez – 2001

All-EuroLeague Second Team
Jorge Garbajosa – 2006

All-ACB First Team
Jorge Garbajosa – 2005, 2006
Jayson Granger – 2015

All-ACB Second Team
Nemanja Nedović – 2017

EuroCup Finals MVP
Alberto Díaz – 2017

Reserve team
Baloncesto Málaga B is the reserve team of Unicaja, basketball based in Málaga.

From 2007 to 2016, Baloncesto Málaga had an agreement with CB Axarquía, for them to play as the club's main farm team, while Baloncesto Málaga B, which currently plays also under the name Unicaja, was the club's third team until the end of this contract.

Women's team
On 14 July 2017, the club announced the creation of a women's team.

Just in its second season, Unicaja promoted to Liga Femenina 2.

Season by season

References

External links
 Official Website 
 Baloncesto Málaga at ACB.com 
 Baloncesto Málaga at Euroleague.net
 Baloncesto Málaga at Eurobasket.com

 
Basketball teams in Andalusia
Liga ACB teams
Basketball teams established in 1977
1977 establishments in Spain